In event-driven computer programs, an event cascade occurs when an event handler causes another event to occur which also triggers an event handler. This can be a tricky source of program errors (see computer bug).
An event generated from the code executed in another event response. 

Computer programming